General Fanshawe may refer to:

Edward Fanshawe (British Army officer) (1859–1952), British Army lieutenant general
Evelyn Fanshawe (1895–1979), British Army major general 
Hew Dalrymple Fanshawe (1860–1957), British Army lieutenant general
Robert Fanshawe (British Army officer) (1863–1946), British Army major general